Haemoproteus parabelopolskyi  is a species of parasitic alveolates that infects birds.

Seventeen strains of H. parabelopolskyi are found only in the blackcap, and form a monophyletic group; three further members of that group are found only in the garden warbler, and another three occur in the African hill babbler, supporting the shared ancestry of the three bird species.

References

Haemosporida
Species described in 1890
Parasites of birds